Sodium/hydrogen exchanger 10, also known as solute carrier family 9 member 10, is a protein that in humans is encoded by the SLC9A10 gene.

Function 

SLC9A10 is a member of the sodium-hydrogen exchanger (NHE) family and is required for male fertility and sperm motility.

References 

Solute carrier family